Sweethearts for the Girls is a 1941 Argentine comedy film directed by Antonio Momplet and starring Santiago Arrieta.

Cast
 Tito Lusiardo
 Amelia Bence
 Felisa Mary
 Nélida Bilbao
 Paquita Vehil
 Silvana Roth
 Lea Conti
 Pablo Palitos

References

External links
 

1941 films
1941 comedy films
1940s Spanish-language films
Argentine comedy films
Argentine black-and-white films
Films directed by Antonio Momplet
1940s Argentine films